Neil Rosendorff (22 January 1945 – 12 September 2015) was a South African cricketer. He played 70 first-class matches for Orange Free State between 1962 and 1979.

References

External links
 

1945 births
2015 deaths
South African cricketers
Free State cricketers
Cricketers from Bloemfontein